Khalilollah (also Romanized as Khalīlollāh) is a village in Kanduleh Rural District, Dinavar District, Sahneh County, Kermanshah Province, Iran. At the 2006 census, its population was 31, in 5 families.

References 

Populated places in Sahneh County